Fernando Pereira Soler (Madrid, December 24, 1930–Barcelona, March 31, 2018), civil engineer, university professor and third dean of IESE Business School. His book "Accounting for Management", first published in 1970, is in its 25th edition.

Education 
Fernando Pereira attended the Colegio Nuestra Señora del Pilar in Madrid, before studying engineering at the Escuela Técnica Superior de Ingenieros de Caminos, Canales y Puertos of the Universidad Politécnica de Madrid (1951-1956). He graduated from the L'École d'Administration des Affaires in Lille in 1959 and attended the Managerial Economics Seminar at the University of California, Berkeley in 1961. In 1967, he received a PhD in engineering from the Universidad Politécnica de Madrid.

IESE Business School 
Fernando Pereira was a key figure in the founding of IESE Business School, alongside Antonio Valero Vicente. In 1958, he moved to Barcelona and formed part of the founding team, which also included Félix Huerta Herrero, Anton Wurster, Rafael Termes, Juan Ferrán Nadal and Carlos Cavallé.  With Valero, he travelled to numerous educational institutions around Europe to get a firsthand perspective of the best practices in business education. During their visit to the L'École d'Administration des Affaires in Lille, it was decided that Pereira would stay there to finish his teacher training.  A year later, he joined IESE's Department of Information and Economic Control as a professor.

In addition to his teaching responsibilities, Pereira  actively promoted and developed research at IESE, serving as the university's research director (1959-1964) as well as its director of executive education programs.

After serving on the board of directors, he was named the school's dean (1970-1978), succeeding Juan Ginebra Torra.  He was known as a leader who listened to the opinions of others, and who surrounded himself with a trustworthy team, making important decisions collaboratively.

His tenure saw the flourishing of the Harvard-IESE Committee and the launch of the IAE Business School in Buenos Aires, which would later become part of the Universidad Austral. He also contributed to the creation of the Instituto Panamericano de Alta Dirección de Empresa (IPADE), which eventually formed part of the Universidad Panamericana de México.

Another milestone in his leadership was the opening of the IESE campus in Madrid in 1974, in order to promote training for business leaders and executives in the Spanish capital.

Under his direction, the alumni association grew into a vibrant source of support and advice, and a means of continued contact between current and former students, faculty and academic leadership.

In 1978, for health reasons, he was replaced as IESE's dean by Juan Antonio Pérez López, but remained on the board of directors (1978-1981). Later, he served as associate dean under Pedro Nueno (1981-1992).

An avid reader, he was a great connoisseur of English authors such as G.K. Chesterton, C.S. Lewis, R. Knox and H. Newman.

Professor of Accounting 

Pereira was a professor of accounting and financial management at IESE for decades, both in the MBA and the executive education programs. In 2001, he was named professor emeritus.

As a professor, he had a gift for making complex accounting principles accessible and engaging,  able to captivate a full classroom with his rhetorical questions and sense of humor.

His book "Accounting for Management" is a classic among accounting textbooks. In the prologue, he gives some basic advice for solving complicated problems:

«Complex problems are solved with the help of a pencil, an eraser and a sheet of paper” 

The book is aimed at anyone who is not a professional accountant but who requires a knowledge of accounting. While highly practical, it is also academically rigorous, thanks to the author's experience in the private sector and as a professor.

Publications

Books 
 Pereira, F. (1970), Contabilidad para dirección, 1st ed. EUNSA.
 Pereira, F., et al. (1985), Enciclopedia de administración y contabilidad, Desclée de Brouwer, Bilbao.
 Pereira, F., et al. (2012), Contabilidad para dirección, 25th ed., EUNSA.

Chapters in Books 
 Pereira, F. (1990), "La contabilidad de una empresa industrial,” in F. Pereira, et al., Curso de Contabilidad y Finanzas, vol. 4: Las finanzas en la empresa, Plaza & Janés, (La empresa, dirección y administración), Barcelona, pp. 1–20.
 "Pereira, F. (1997), "La información contable de grupos de sociedades,” in C. García Pont, et al., Gestión de empresas diversificadas, Ediciones Folio, (Biblioteca IESE de Gestión de Empresas, vol. pp. 87–117.

References 

1930 births
2018 deaths
Academic staff of the University of Navarra